1st Rank Raju is a 2015 Indian Kannada comedy drama film written and directed by Naresh Kumar HN in his debut, and produced by V. K. Manjunath. It features Gurunandan and Apoorva Gowda in the lead roles. The rest of the cast includes Tanishka Kapoor, Sadhu Kokila, Ananth Nag, Achyut Rao, Manadeep Rai, Giri Mahesh and Master Chinmai. The film's music director Kiran Ravindranath.The director remade the film in Telugu in 2019 with the same title.

Synopsis
Film explores the importance of the academic qualification in life. The story line conveys the message to parents who consider only academic achievements results in successful life. It was the most talked movie in 2015, commercially too, the movie tasted tremendous success.

Cast
 Gurunandan as Raju / Raj The Showman
 Apoorwa Gowda as Sanmitha
 Tanishka Kapoor as Mary
 Ananth Nag as Company MD Satyamurthy
 Achyuth Kumar as Raju's Dad
 Sadhu Kokila as Shani Kappor (S.K, Shani)
 Sudha Belawadi as Raju's Mom
 Jai Jagadish as School Principal
 Mandeep Rai as Principal of college
 Giri Mahesh as Gudli Hero 
 Master Chinmayi as First Rank Raju (young)
 Nagaraja Murthy as Karnataka Education Minister
 Amith as Friend
 Ashwin Kodange as Manager

Soundtrack
The music of the film was composed by Kiran Ravindranath.

Reception 
A critic from The Times of India wrote that "Director Naresh Kumar has come up with an entertaining film, where the message isn't forced. The casting is quite accurate. Gurunandan as Raju excels. The music, cinematography, editing and re-recording too are commendable. Watch this film for its entertainment quotient and good performances".

References

External links
 

2015 films
Indian comedy-drama films
2010s Kannada-language films
Kannada films remade in other languages
2015 comedy-drama films